Miss Global is an international beauty pageant established in 2013. The contest is about empowering women, giving them a voice to speak up in making a difference. It's about embracing cultures, accepting our differences, celebrating our diversity and understanding that is what makes us special and unique. The Miss Global pageant is the only major international pageant that accepts single mothers, as a result, it is the only pageant with the widest age range from 18 to 35 years old.

The reigning Miss Global for 2021 and 2022 were Jessica Da Silva of United Arab Emirates and Shane Tormes of the Philippines. They were crowned by Karolína Kokešová of Czech Republic on June 11, 2022.

Editions

Note: The 2nd edition of the contest (2014) was held on a Crown Princess cruise ship voyaging from Los Angeles, U.S. to Puerto Vallarta, Mexico.

Titleholders

Country/Territory by number of wins 

Miss Global 2013 Results 

Miss Global 2013
  - Emily Kiss
1st Runner-Up
  - Emilia Zoryan
2nd Runner-Up
  - Joanna Hill
3rd Runner-Up
  - Apneet Mann
4th Runner-Up
  - Reine Abhala
Top 10
  - Emily Rogers 
  - Naiane Nunes 
  - Marilyn Mark 
  - Sierra Caldwell 
  - Jeniffer Kelly 
Top 20
  - Elissa Sarah
  - Shamika Wells
  - Natasha Di Flore
  - Soojeong Shin
  - Cristal Aguirre 
  - Charmaine Chiong
  - Willow Garcia 
  - Natasha Gulina
  - Viktoria Sorokhmanluk
  - Khanh Tran

Miss Global 2014 Results

Miss Global 2014
  - Ella Mino
1st Runner-Up
  - Elise Natalie Duncan
2nd Runner-Up
  - Catherine Almirante
3rd Runner-Up
  - Aizhan Lighl
4th Runner-Up
  - Benazir Thaha
Top 10
  - Fulya Azzghayer
  - Christina Chelliah
  - Madison O'Neill   
  - Carole Schell
  - Alli Garcia

Miss Global 2015 Results

Miss Global 2015
  - Jessica Peart
1st Runner-Up
  - Virginia Prak
2nd Runner-Up
  - Lorna Murphy
3rd Runner-Up
  - Gergana Doncheva
4th Runner-Up
  - Candice Ramos 
Top 11
  - Luisa Fernanda Millan
  - Angie Durkee
  - Htet Yee Aungi
  - Zandile Tanda
  - Jollie Chi 
  - Mariah Coogan
Top 20
  - Saudhi Rodriguez 
  - Sophie Rankin 
  - Ariella Basdeo
  - Bareket Drori
  - Katia Zakaria 
  - Jiyoug Yung
  - Karolina Jazwinski
  - Jane Huynh 
  - Rubia Bari

Miss Global 2016 Results 

Miss Global 2016
  - Angela Bonilla
1st Runner-Up
  - Camille Hirro Jensen
 
2nd Runner-Up
  - Caitlynn Henry
3rd Runner-Up
  - Nikola Bechynová
4th Runner-Up
  - Britt Camillo Rekkedal
Top 10
  - Trisha Vergo
  - Helen Zhong 
  - Sonam Patel 
  - Tima Keilah
  - Valeriya Vergunova
Top 20
  - Khumo Leburu
  - Steliyana Filipova
  - Dane Ny 
  - Katherine Saavedra 
  - Melika Razavi 
  - Faith Obaegbulam
  - Marina Shameeva 
  - Linnea Johanson 
  - Adrianna Edwards 
  - Daryna Ilvoska

Miss Global 2017 Results 

Miss Global 2017
  - Barbara Vitorelli
1st Runner-Up
  - Tenielle Adderley
2nd Runner-Up
  - Selina Kriechbaum
3rd Runner-Up
  - Ayan Said
4th Runner-Up
  - Lily Wu 
Top 11
  - Sophia Harris 
  - Paulina Yos
  - Bianca Eid
  - Karla Isabel Peniche Hernández 
  - Laura Elizabeth Hubbard
  - Samantha Joy Hart
Top 20
  - Katherine Vega Triviño
  - Zuzana Straková
  - Mary Ann Mungcal
  - Mariana Degener Tomaz 
  - Palesa Belinda Tsuai 
  - Naomi Imanuel Elizabeth Trotz  
  - Sukanya Samut 
  - Tenzin Paldon  
  - Vindy Krejcí

Miss Global 2018 Results

Miss Global 2018
  - Sophia Ng
1st Runner-Up
  - Amber Bernachi
2nd Runner-Up
  - Tamila Khodjaeva
3rd Runner-Up
  - Seydina Allen
4th Runner-Up
  - Pamela Lee Urbina
Top 11
  - Lauriane Almeda 
  - Rachel Falzon
  - Juliana Soares da Silva 
  - Soriyan Hang
  - Dayanna Lucia Mendez Espinoza 
  - Phamolchanok Dhilokratchatasakul
Top 20
  - Hanna Maroz
  - Eleonora Stoyanova
  - Nikola Uhlirová
  - Fabienne Nicole Groenveld
  - Rachel Park
  - Grecia Yazmin Montañez Ochoa
  - Uchka Jimsee
  - Mary Eileen Palencia Gonzales 
  - Liz Carolina Cabrera Silva

 
Miss Global 2019 Results 

Miss Global 2019
  - Karolina Kokesova
1st Runner-Up
  - Hany Portocarrero Novoa
2nd Runner-Up
  - Adrielle Pieve de Castro 
3rd Runner-Up
  - Riza Santos
4th Runner-Up
  - Mikaela-Rose Fowler 
Top 12
  - Tiyana Cackovic
  - Yeniffer Marin
  - Palmira Ruiz
  - Christie Fewry
  - Katherine Peña
  - Mariangela Marin 
  - Nguyen Thi My Duyên
Top 16
  - Angel Bhathal
  - Ashleigh Wild 
  - Tashiana Buller
  - Santa Igaune
Top 25
  - Jerchovia Moxey
  - Mayelita Estefania Velarde Fernandez 
  - Marlyne Ledoux
  - Kumiko Lau
  - Hend Kamel Ajeel
  - Dojeong Lee
  - Rowena Waveren
  - Emily Sullivan 
  - Veronika Denisova
  - Tanja Grubnic

Miss Global 2021/2022 Results

Gallery of winners

References

External links
 

International beauty pageants